Rajanadai is a 1989 Indian Tamil-language action film directed by S. A. Chandrasekhar. The film stars Vijayakanth, Gautami, Vidhyashree and Seetha. It was released on 28 October 1989. The film was later remade in Hindi by Chandrasekhar as Jeevan Ki Shatranj (1993).

Plot 

Vijayakanth, an honest C.I.D. inspector, is married to Seetha and they have a daughter Shamili. Vijayakanth has enough evidence to arrest a dangerous criminal Tiger Kaali. Vijayakanth befriends Rekha, a C.I.D inspector, without knowing that she is Seetha's friend. Seetha compels Rekha to live with them. Seetha has blood cancer but she conceals this from her husband. When her husband and her friend know this news, they decide to go in the United States for treatment but Kaali manages to kill Seetha and erases the proofs. Vijayakanth is now more determined to catch him.

Cast 

Vijayakanth as CID Inspector Vijayakanth
Gautami as Rekha
Vidhyashree as Thenmozhi
Seetha as Seetha
Suresh as Pandian
Charan Raj as Tiger Kaali
Radha Ravi as Chakravarthy
Senthamarai
Shamili as Shamili
S. S. Chandran
Kovai Sarala
Ennathe Kannaiah as Jail Superintendent
Kuyili in a Special appearance

Soundtrack 

The music was composed by M. S. Viswanathan, with lyrics written by Vaali and Pulamaipithan.

Release and reception 
Rajanadai was released on 28 October 1989, alongside another Vijayakanth starrer Dharmam Vellum. P. S. S. of Kalki wrote that on one hand, there was a desire to express the sentiment of affection for wife, child and family, and on the other hand, there was a desire to take revenge on anti-social forces; director Chandrasekhar tried to bind the fans by separating the two, and the rope was not strong.

References

External links 

1980s Tamil-language films
1989 action films
1989 films
Fictional portrayals of the Tamil Nadu Police
Films directed by S. A. Chandrasekhar
Films scored by M. S. Viswanathan
Indian action films
Indian films about revenge
Tamil films remade in other languages